Alessandro Correa (born July 5, 1980), better known as Sandrinho, is a former Brazilian footballer who played as an attacking midfielder.

Career
Sandrinho made his debut at Nacional Futebol Clube, where he played in the seasons 1998–2000. In 2000, he moved to Mexican side Club de Fútbol Monterrey. There he played from 2000 to 2002. In June 2003 Sandrinho returned to Brazil, signing a contract with Esporte Clube Juventude. Due to his performances there, manager Itzhak Shum of Litex Lovech signed him in January 2005. Sandrinho quickly became part of the main team. With Litex he won two times the Bulgarian Cup - in 2008 and in 2009 in addition to two national titles - in 2010 and 2011. Sandrinho left the club from Lovech with the expiration of his contract in June 2012.

Career statistics

Awards
Litex Lovech
 Bulgarian A PFG 2009/2010, 2010/2011
 Bulgarian Cup 2 times - 2008, 2009
 Bulgarian Supercup 2010

References

External links
 
 Brazilian FA Database
 Profile at zerozero.pt

1980 births
Living people
Brazilian footballers
Brazilian expatriate footballers
C.F. Monterrey players
Esporte Clube Juventude players
PFC Litex Lovech players
First Professional Football League (Bulgaria) players
Expatriate footballers in Mexico
Expatriate footballers in Bulgaria
Brazilian expatriate sportspeople in Bulgaria
Association football midfielders